The 2013 VFW Sport Clips Help a Hero 200 was the ninth stock car race of the 2013 NASCAR Nationwide Series and the 31st iteration of the event. The race was held on Friday, May 10, 2013, in Darlington, South Carolina, at Darlington Raceway, a  permanent egg-shaped oval racetrack. The race took the scheduled 147 laps to complete. At race's end, Joe Gibbs Racing driver Kyle Busch would dominate the race to win his 56th career NASCAR Nationwide Series win and his fifth win of the season. To fill out the podium, Elliott Sadler and Matt Kenseth of Joe Gibbs Racing would finish second and third, respectively.

Background 

Darlington Raceway is a race track built for NASCAR racing located near Darlington, South Carolina. It is nicknamed "The Lady in Black" and "The Track Too Tough to Tame" by many NASCAR fans and drivers and advertised as "A NASCAR Tradition." It is of a unique, somewhat egg-shaped design, an oval with the ends of very different configurations, a condition which supposedly arose from the proximity of one end of the track to a minnow pond the owner refused to relocate. This situation makes it very challenging for the crews to set up their cars' handling in a way that is effective at both ends.

Entry list

Practice 
The only practice session was held on Friday, May 10, at 8:30 AM EST, and would last for two hours.

Qualifying 
Qualifying was held on Friday, May 10, at 3:35 PM EST. Each driver would have two laps to set a fastest time; the fastest of the two would count as their official qualifying lap.

Two drivers would fail to qualify: Jason Bowles and Derrike Cope.

Full qualifying results

Race results

References 

2013 NASCAR Nationwide Series
NASCAR races at Darlington Raceway
May 2013 sports events in the United States
2013 in sports in South Carolina